Damán of Tígh-Damáin, in Uí Criomhthannain. He was of the Dál Cormaic of the Leinstermen and a brother of St. Abbán and St. Senach of Cill-mór. His feast-day is February 12.

References

Medieval Irish saints